is a former Japanese football player.

Playing career
Yoneyama was born in Kuwana on June 10, 1982. After graduating from high school, he joined J1 League club Cerezo Osaka in 2001. On September 29, he debuted as substitute forward against Júbilo Iwata. However Cerezo was relegated J2 League end of 2001 season and he could only play this match until 2002. In 2003, he moved to J2 club Sagan Tosu on loan. He played many matches as offensive midfielder. In 2004, he returned to Cerezo Osaka which was returned to J1 from 2004. Although he played several matches, he could not play many matches until 2005. In October 2005, he moved to Regional Leagues club Rosso Kumamoto. Rosso was promoted to Japan Football League end of 2005 season. In 2006, he played many matches. In 2007, he moved to Regional Leagues club Zweigen Kanazawa. He played as regular player in 2 seasons. He retired end of 2008 season.

Club statistics

References

External links

1982 births
Living people
Association football people from Mie Prefecture
Japanese footballers
J1 League players
J2 League players
Japan Football League players
Cerezo Osaka players
Sagan Tosu players
Roasso Kumamoto players
Zweigen Kanazawa players
Association football midfielders